Jüri Tarmak (21 July 1946 – 22 June 2022) was an Estonian high jumper who competed for the Soviet Union.

Career
Tarmak took up athletics in 1963, following his father Aadu Tarmak, who was the Soviet champion in the discus throw in 1943–44. In 1970 he became a member of the Soviet national team. He won a silver and a bronze medal at the European Indoor Championships in 1971 and 1972, and an Olympic gold medal in 1972. Tarmak was the last Olympic champion who used the straddle technique. In 1974 he retired from competitions, and next year graduated in economics from the Saint Petersburg State University. In 1985 he defended a PhD in economics and from  1985 to 1990 lectured at the same university. After the breakup of the Soviet Union he returned to his native Estonia where in 1990 founded an investment company. He later became a vice-president and consultant with the Tallinn Stock Exchange. He remained involved with sport and between 2001 and 2012 headed the sports club Tallinna Kompass.

References

External links
 

1946 births
2022 deaths
Athletes from Tallinn
Soviet male high jumpers
Estonian male high jumpers
Olympic gold medalists for the Soviet Union
Athletes (track and field) at the 1972 Summer Olympics
Olympic athletes of the Soviet Union
Medalists at the 1972 Summer Olympics
Olympic gold medalists in athletics (track and field)
Honoured Masters of Sport of the USSR